Stephen Michael Lord Brooker (born 21 May 1981) is an English former football striker.

He began his career with Watford in 1999, before moving on to Port Vale in 2001, following a short loan spell. With Vale he won the Football League Trophy in 2001. He transferred to Bristol City in 2004, where he would spend the next five years. In 2008, he spent time on loan at both Cheltenham Town and Doncaster Rovers, before he joined Doncaster permanently in 2009. He spent two years with the club before he was released due to injury concerns. He signed with Buxton in October 2012.

Career
Brooker came through the youth system at Watford before joining Port Vale, initially on loan, in January 2001. He was signed by manager Brian Horton on the recommendation of coach Martin Foyle (who would succeed Horton as manager in February 2004). He signed permanently the following month for £15,000. He helped the "Valiants" to lift the 2001 Football League Trophy, after he scored past Brentford in the final.

Forced to undergo a hernia operation at the start of the 2002–03 season, he recovered to score five goals in thirty games. After he recovered from a hamstring injury that caused him to miss a month at the start of the 2003–04 season, he went on to finish the campaign with eight goals in 34 games.

He started the 2004–05 season in tremendous form, scoring for four successive league games in August, including a brace past Hull City. With his contract up in the summer, the next month he was sold to Bristol City for a fee of £225,000. This came days after fans were told he was not for sale and would not be moving by Vale chairman Bill Bratt – a statement that convinced City chairman Stephen Lansdown that "we must now look elsewhere." He went on to have a highly successful season with City, scoring sixteen goals for the club, despite suffering from a broken toe. This gave him a total of 21 goals for both Vale and City in 2004–05, and won him another year on his contract with City. This extended deal quashed rumours of a move to Norwich City.

He was both the club's player of the season and top scorer in the 2005–06 season with sixteen league goals, one of these goals came against former club Port Vale after the player claimed that the boo-boys at Vale Park inspired him to find the net. His form helped the club go from bottom of the league in December, to finish just six points shy of the play-offs. He was rewarded with a new deal with the club, despite having two years remaining on his existing contract.

He scored three goals in 27 games during City's 2006–07 promotion-winning campaign. However, on his release from prison in September he found himself battling a catalogue of injuries, that would go on to plague him for a number of years. He missed the start of the campaign with hamstring and knee injuries, and picked up a further knee injury in April, which caused him to miss the club's pre-season tour of Latvia.

He missed much of the 2007–08 season after being forced to undergo two knee operations. In January Brooker was made available for a loan spell so as to regain fitness, and twenty clubs put in offers. After recovering from illness and a further back injury, he joined Keith Downing's League One side Cheltenham Town on a one-month loan. This deal was later extended by another month. Playing fourteen games with the "Robins", he scored his five goals for the club in the space of six matches, helping the club to avoid relegation into League Two. His form persuaded manager Gary Johnson to re-call him to Bristol. On his return to City he scored an emotional late goal against Norwich to send his club top of the table; however the "Reds" would have to settle with a play-off place. Overall, he played just four games of the club's march to the play-off Final with Hull City, and was not named on the teamsheet in the final itself. Cheltenham were hopeful of signing the striker in the summer, but were denied the chance to have him back on loan, despite City having six strikers on the books.

He started the 2008–09 season well by coming off the bench to get the late winners at Blackpool, Peterborough United, and Coventry City. However he was then struck down by an Achilles injury. On the November loan window deadline day, he joined Doncaster Rovers on a one-month loan with a view to a permanent deal. He came on as a substitute for his Rovers debut against Watford and scored with his first touch to give his new team a 1–1 draw. However, he suffered a torn calf muscle in training and returned to Ashton Gate. He returned to Rovers permanently for an undisclosed fee in January 2009, penning a two and a half-year deal despite not being fully fit. He was initially expected to be rested for two weeks, but soon found himself out of action on a long-term basis after requiring an operation to fix an ankle injury.

He missed the entirety of the 2009–10 campaign with his injury problems. In the 2010–11 campaign he finally made his second appearance for the club, and on 30 April, Brooker scored his second goal for "Donny" when he blasted a 25 half-volley into the net to earn his club a 1–1 draw with Leicester City – the point ensured his club safety from relegation. However he was still released from the club at the end of the season.

In October 2012 he joined Northern Premier League Premier Division side Buxton, after training with the "Bucks" for several weeks trying to build his fitness up. The club finished seventh in 2012–13.

Style of play
Brooker was a forward with aggression and strength.

Personal life
On 1 September 2006, Brooker was sentenced to prison for 28 days for his part in a 2005 nightclub brawl, which also saw his Bristol City teammates Bradley Orr and David Partridge imprisoned. Two weeks later, he and Orr were released on licence, having served half of their original sentence in custody. The sentence was described by City chairman Stephen Lansdown as 'harsh'.

Career statistics

Honours
Individual
Bristol City F.C. Player of the season: 2005–06

Port Vale
Football League Trophy: 2001

Bristol City
League Onesecond-place promotion: 2006–07

References

External links

1981 births
Living people
People from Newport Pagnell
Association football forwards
English footballers
Watford F.C. players
Port Vale F.C. players
Bristol City F.C. players
Cheltenham Town F.C. players
Doncaster Rovers F.C. players
Buxton F.C. players
Premier League players
English Football League players
Northern Premier League players